Croceivirga is a genus of bacteria from the family of Flavobacteriaceae with one known species (Croceivirga radicis). Croceivirga radicis has been isolated from a rotten mangrove root.

References

Flavobacteria
Bacteria genera
Monotypic bacteria genera